SS Ixion was a Dutch cargo ship that caught fire and sank near the coast of the Netherlands East Indies in 1911.

Construction 
Ixion was launched on 23 November 1892 and completed the following month at the Scott Shipbuilding & Engineering Co. shipyard in Greenock, United Kingdom.

She had a triple expansion steam engine driving a single screw propeller. The engine was rated at 2285 indicated horsepower.

Sinking 
On 1 October 1911, one of Ixion′s coal bunkers caught fire and sank the ship off the coast of the Netherlands East Indies. 24 of the 47 crew members died; the remaining 23 crew were rescued by the British steamer Good Hope.

References

Cargo ships
1892 ships
Maritime incidents in 1911
Ship fires
Shipwrecks in the South China Sea
Steamships of the Netherlands
Ships built on the River Clyde
October 1911 events